The 3rd District of the Iowa House of Representatives in the state of Iowa.

Current elected officials
Dennis Bush is the representative currently representing the district.

Past representatives
The district has previously been represented by:
 Irvin L. Bergman, 1971–1973
 Ingwer L. Hansen, 1973–1983
 Leo P. Miller, 1983–1985
 Don Shoning, 1985–1993
 Christopher Rants, 1993–2003
 Ralph Klemme, 2003–2005
 Chuck Soderberg, 2005–2013
 Dan Huseman, 2013–2021
 Dennis Bush, 2021–present

References

003